Jarosław Marek Rymkiewicz (Jarosław Marek Szulc; 13 July 1935 – 3 February 2022) was a Polish poet, essayist, dramatist, translator and literary critic. He is the recipient of the 2003 Nike Award, Poland's most important literary prize.

Life and work
Rymkiewicz was the son of Władysław Szulc, of German and Polish origin, who changed his last name to Rymkiewicz (a writer) and wife Hanna Baranowska, of German and Tatar origin (a physician).

He studied Polish philology at the University of Łódź and worked at the Literary Research Institute of Polish Academy of Sciences and Letters. As a poet, he was influenced by the traditions of classicism and the baroque. He has received multiple prizes for his novels, essays, and translations, including the Kościelski Prize (1967), S. Vincenz Prize (1985), and Polish PEN Club Prize. His volume of poetry Zachód słońca w Milanówku won the prestigious Nike Award in 2003.

Although Rymkiewicz was primarily a poet, he is better known as the author of two influential novels that contributed to the two most important debates of the 1980s: that involving the 1981 martial law and Polish-Jewish relations. His novel Rozmowy polskie latem, 1983 (Polish Conversations in Summer 1983) discusses the meaning of being Polish and the preoccupation with achieving independence. Rymkiewicz’s second novel, entitled Umschlagplatz (1988), had a greater impact. Instytut Literacki, the largest Polish émigré publishing house, originally published the novel in Paris in 1988 as it could not appear in communist Poland. It was reprinted a few times by underground publishing houses in Poland but officially appeared only in 1992 after the communists lost power in 1989. It was translated into French (1989), German (1993), and English (1994).

The novel focuses on the symbolic meaning of Umschlagplatz, which denotes a small square in German-occupied Warsaw (1939–1945) from which the Germans sent more than 300,000 Jews to their deaths, and thus a place which "may well be the only place of its kind" in the world. (p. 7, Umschlagplatz). He attempts to understand the implication of the existence of such a place for the contemporary Warsaw and the contemporary Poles. It took Rymkiewicz two years of study and research to create a detailed plan of the square. He concluded that Germans introduced the name Umschlagplatz sometime before July 1942; in pre-war Poland the place was called Transfer Square and was the center for the Jewish wholesale trade.

He is also known as a translator, particularly of American poetry (T. S. Eliot and Wallace Stevens) and of Spanish poetry (Federico García Lorca and Pedro Calderón de la Barca).

As an essayist, Rymkiewicz concentrated on Polish history (the partition period, World War II).

He supported the conservative Law and Justice political party. Rymkiewicz died on 3 February 2022, at the age of 86.

Publications

Poetry
Each year links to its corresponding "[year] in poetry" article:
 1957: Konwencje ("Conventions")
 1983: Ulica Mandelsztama ("Mandelstam Street")
 1984: Mogila Ordona ("Ordon's Grave")
 1993: Moje dzielo posmiertne ("My Posthumous Works") Krakow: Znak
 1999: Znak niejasny, baśń półżywa ("The Unclear sign, a Half-living Legend"), Warsaw: Państwowy Instytut Wydawniczy
 2002: Zachód słońca w Milanówku ("Sunset in Milanówek"), Warsaw: Sic!
 2006: Do widzenia gawrony ("Good-bye, Rooks"), Warsaw: Sic!

Prose
Each year links to its corresponding "[year] in literature" article:

Books of Essays
 1967: Czym jest klasycyzm ("What is Classicism?")
 1968: Mysli rozne o ogrodach ("Various Thoughts about Gardens")
 1977: Aleksander Fredro jest w zlym humorze ("Aleksander Fredro is in a Bad Mood")
 1982: Juliusz Slowacki pyta o gozine ("Juliusz Slowacki Inquires about the Time"). Warsaw: Czytelnik
 1983: Wielki Ksiaze ("Archduke"). Warsaw: PIW
 1987: Zmut Warsaw: Niezalezna Oficyna Wydawnicza
 1989: Baket
 1994: Kilka szczegolow ("A Few Particulars"). Cracow: Arcana
 1996: Do Snowia i dalej ("To Snow and Beyond"). Cracow: Arcana
 2001: Lesmian. Encyklopedia ("Lesmian. Encyclopedia"). Warsaw: Sic!
 2004: Słowacki. Encyklopedia ("Słowacki: The Encyclopaedia"), Warsaw: Sic!
 2007: Wieszanie ("Hanging"), Warszawa: Sic!
 2008: Kinderszenen, Warszawa: Sic!

Novels
 1983: Rozmowy polskie latem roku 1983 ("Polish Conversations during 1983 Summer")
 1988: Umschlagplatz

Comedies
 1970: Krol Miesopust ("The King of Meat")
 1971: Porwanie Europy ("The Abduction of Europe")
 1972: Kochankowie pieklo ("The Lovers of Hell")
 1973: Niebianskie bliznieta ("The Heavenly Twins")
 1979: Dwor nad Narwia ("Country House on the Narwa")

References

Further reading
 Joanna Michlic. "Umschlagplatz". [In:] Polin. A Journal of Polish-Jewish Studies 6(1991): pp. 333–338.
 Katarzyna Zechenter. "Marek Rymkiewicz". [In:] Holocaust Literature. An Encyclopedia of Writers and Their Work. Vol.2. Ed. S. Lillian Kremer. Routledge 2003, pp. 1063–1067. .

External links
 Instytut Książki Web page on Rymkiewicz

1935 births
2022 deaths
20th-century Polish dramatists and playwrights
20th-century Polish poets
Polish male dramatists and playwrights
Polish people of German descent
Polish people of Lipka Tatar descent
Nike Award winners
Polish male poets
University of Łódź alumni
Writers from Warsaw
People associated with the magazine "Kultura"